The 2011–12 Cypriot Second Division was the 57th season of the Cypriot second-level football league. Ayia Napa won their 1st title.

Team Changes from 2010–11

Teams promoted to 2011–12 Cypriot First Division
 Aris Limassol
 Nea Salamina
 Anagennisi Deryneia

Teams relegated from 2010–11 Cypriot First Division
 AEP Paphos
 Doxa Katokopias
 APOP Kinyras

Teams promoted from 2010–11 Cypriot Third Division
 Champions: Ethnikos Assia
 Runners-up: Enosis Neon Parekklisia, Ayia Napa

Teams relegated to 2011–12 Cypriot Third Division
 ASIL Lysi
 Digenis Morphou
 Adonis Idaliou

League table

Promotion group

Results

Season statistics

Top scorers
Including matches played on March 24, 2012; Source: CFA

See also
 2011–12 Cypriot First Division
 2011–12 Cypriot Cup

Sources

Cypriot Second Division seasons
2011–12 in Cypriot football
Cyprus